Isabel Erica was the name of two ships operated by Moller & Co, Hong Kong:

, managed from 1958, scrapped in 1969
, built in 1970, sold 1975

Ship names